Pope Barrow Billups (October 11, 1889 – December 6, 1955) was an American lawyer and politician. He represented the 21st district in the New York State Assembly.

Pope Billups was born in Athens, Georgia, and graduated from the Florida Baptist Academy in 1910, and then attended Florida A&M University. He earned a Bachelor of Laws from New York University in 1916, and was admitted to the New York State Bar Association the year after. He was elected in 1925.

See also
List of African-American officeholders (1900-1959)

References

1889 births
1955 deaths
African-American state legislators in New York (state)
20th-century American politicians
Republican Party members of the New York State Assembly
New York University School of Law alumni
Florida A&M University alumni
20th-century African-American politicians
African-American men in politics